Romanian singer Inna has released eight studio albums, three compilations, 62 singles (including 15 as featured artist) and 46 promotional singles. Her YouTube channel surpassed three billion total views as of May 2019. 24 of her singles have reached the top ten in Romania, with "Hot", "Amazing", "Diggy Down", "Bebe", "Up" and "Tare" topping the country's singles chart in 2008, 2009, 2015, 2020, 2021 and 2022, respectively. With global album sales of four million copies from her first three studio albums, Inna is the best-selling Romanian artist.

The singer began her career after releasing her debut single, "Hot", produced by native trio Play & Win in 2008. Reaching the top 20 across multiple charts, it achieved commercial success worldwide and was certified Gold in Italy, Silver in the United Kingdom and Platinum in Spain. Throughout 2009 and early 2010, she released four more singles from her debut studio album, Hot (2009), which sold 500,000 copies worldwide. "Amazing"—released from Hot—peaked atop the Romanian chart, while "10 Minutes" marked the fourth time that Inna reached the top 10 in France. Inna's second record, I Am the Club Rocker, was made available for purchase in 2011, and included a collaboration with American hip-hop recording artist Flo Rida and Spanish singer Juan Magán on a remix of "Club Rocker" and on "Un Momento", respectively. The album's lead single, "Sun Is Up", was certified Gold in Italy and Switzerland, and Silver in the United Kingdom.

Roton distributed the singer's third studio album, Party Never Ends, in March 2013. The record spawned "Tu şi eu", the Romanian-language version of "Crazy Sexy Wild", which peaked at number five in Romania. "More than Friends", a collaboration with American reggaeton performer Daddy Yankee, reached number seven in Spain and was certified Gold for video streams of four million. In 2015, Inna released her eponymous fourth studio album and its Japanese counterpart, Body and the Sun. The first single off the Japanese release, "Cola Song", features Colombian reggaeton singer J Balvin as a guest vocalist. The track was a commercial success in Europe, and was certified Platinum in Spain. "Diggy Down", the first single from Inna, scored the singer's third number one single in her native country, while the follow-up "Bop Bop" reached number two.

In the span of one year, Inna released four singles, "Heaven" (2016), "Gimme Gimme" (2017), "Ruleta" (2017) and "Nirvana" (2017) to commercial success in selected European countries. The latter three were included on her fifth studio album Nirvana (2017). Her first Spanish-language album Yo was released in May 2019, spawning the single "Iguana" which reached number four in Romania. The non-album release "Bebe" with Ugandan artist Vinka peaked at number one in March 2020. She released her seventh studio album Heartbreaker in November 2020, which was aided by its lead single "Flashbacks" that attained chart success in the radio rankings of several countries, including those of Romania and the Commonwealth of Independent States. Prior the release of the two-part album Champagne Problems in 2022, "Up" (2021), a non-album single also released as a collaboration with Jamaican recording artist Sean Paul, became Inna's fifth number-one in her native country and entered several rankings elsewhere.

Albums

Studio albums

Compilations

Singles

As lead artist

2000s

2010s

2020s

As featured artist

Promotional singles

Other singles

Other charted songs

Guest appearances

Music videos

See also 
List of certified albums in Romania
List of Romanian Top 100 number ones
List of Airplay 100 number ones

Notes

References

External links 

[ Inna] discography at Allmusic

Discography
Discographies of Romanian artists